Timothy Raymond Tookey (born August 29, 1960) is a Canadian former professional ice hockey centre who played in the National Hockey League (NHL) for the Washington Capitals, Quebec Nordiques, Pittsburgh Penguins, Philadelphia Flyers and Los Angeles Kings.

Playing career
Tookey was selected in the 5th round, 88th overall, by the Washington Capitals in the 1979 NHL Entry Draft. He played three years with the Portland Winter Hawks, and finished with 107 goals and 252 points. He led the American Hockey league in scoring during the 1986-1987 season with 124 points. He is fourth all time in AHL history 974 career points. Tookey was a former coach of the NorPac hockey team Yellowstone Quake.

Career statistics

References

External links
 
Profile at hockeydraftcentral.com

1960 births
Living people
Baltimore Skipjacks players
Canadian ice hockey centres
Fredericton Express players
Hershey Bears players
Los Angeles Kings players
Muskegon Lumberjacks players
New Haven Nighthawks players
Philadelphia Flyers players
Pittsburgh Penguins players
Portland Winterhawks players
Providence Bruins players
Ice hockey people from Edmonton
Quebec Nordiques players
Washington Capitals draft picks
Washington Capitals players